Ross Graham is a Scotland Club XV international rugby union player. He plays as a Hooker.

Rugby Union career

Amateur career

Graham won the Brewin Dolphin Schools Plate with his Hawick High School under-16 team. He first played with Hawick Albion then Hawick PSA.

Graham played for Hawick.

He then moved to Watsonians.

Professional career

Graham was named as a Stage 3 Scottish Rugby Academy player in 2015 assigned to Edinburgh. He played in an Edinburgh 'A' match against Glasgow Warriors 'A' in November 2015.

He was signed on a two-year deal by Yorkshire Carnegie in 2016.

Graham signed for Glasgow Warriors in 2019 to provide cover over the Rugby World Cup period; when Glasgow are expected to lose 16 international players to World Cup duty.

International career

Graham has played for Scotland U17 and Scotland U18 and made his Scotland U20 debut in 2014.

Graham played in all five of Scotland U20 matches in the 2015 U20 Six Nations tournament. He also played in the U20 World Cup for Scotland.

He was named in the 2016 and 2019 Scotland Club XV Squad.

References 

1995 births
Living people
Scottish rugby union players
Glasgow Warriors players
Scotland Club XV international rugby union players
Rugby union players from Melrose, Scottish Borders
Leeds Tykes players
Edinburgh Rugby players
Hawick RFC players
Watsonians RFC players
Rugby union hookers